São Sebastião do Paraíso Biological Reserve is a state biological reserve in the state of Minas Gerais, Brazil.

Location

The São Sebastião do Paraíso Biological Reserve was created by law nº 16.580 of 23 September 1974 and is administered by the State Forestry Institute (IEF).
The reserve is the only one in the municipality of São Sebastião do Paraíso, which was once covered in extensive forests that were indiscriminately cleared in the later part of the 20th century.

Notes

Sources

1974 establishments in Brazil
Biological reserves of Brazil
Protected areas of Minas Gerais
Protected areas established in 1974
Protected areas of the Atlantic Forest